Jean Fouchard (Port au Prince, 2 March 1912 - ibidem, 30 September 1990) was a Haitian historian, journalist, and diplomat. Fouchard was born in Port-au-Prince and earned a law degree there. He worked as a journalist, founding the periodical La Relèvé, and as a diplomat, serving as the ambassador to Cuba. He is best known for his historical publications.

Selected works 

 Les Marrons du Syllabaire (1953)
 Plaisirs de Saint-Domingue (1955)
 Le Théâtre à Saint-Domingue (1955)
 Artistes et Répertoires des Scènes de Saint-Domingue (1955)
 Les Marrons de la Liberté (1972). English translation: The Haitian Maroons: Liberty or Death (1981), with a preface by C. L. R. James
 Langue et Littérature des Aborigènes d'Ayiti (1972)

References

 

1912 births
1990 deaths
20th-century Haitian historians
Haitian male writers
Haitian journalists
People from Port-au-Prince
Ambassadors of Haiti to Cuba
20th-century male writers
20th-century journalists